Brand networking is the engagement of a social networking service around a brand by providing consumers with a platform of relevant content, elements of participation, and a currency, score, or ranking. Brand networking creates communities that serve as interactive destinations to encourage brand participation online and off. This evolved level of user participation with the brand facilitates strong relationships with consumers, leverages sales, and generates fan equity.

History
The development and growth of social networking in the early 2000s gave birth to brand networking. Brands saw the immediate potential to reach and interact with consumers through online platforms like Facebook and MySpace.  At first, the ability to reach consumers through these platforms was inadequate; brands had the option to join as members or simply advertise on these sites.  The potential existed to not only display advertisements to consumers, but to encourage them to interact with the brand.  This is when brands made the shift to create their own networking platforms.
Less evolved attempts to connect brands with consumers via networking are typically built as online platforms meant only to complement a product/service and are limited in functionality.  Typically these sites offer consumers the opportunity to interact through discussion boards and group pages.  The Guiding Light Community was built to complement the popular CBS television soap opera.  The site offers members reward points for contributing content to discussion boards and blogs (which is all geared toward the show).

Structure
Brand networking is more than the utilization of a social networking platform; it is connecting consumers together and constructing relationships directly with the brand.  Three key elements, in unity, create effective brand networking: relevant content, elements of participation, and a competitive currency.

 Websites in conjunction with other media types (TV, radio, print, etc.) present relative content around a vertical industry or sector of interest or cultural/social issues for a brand.  This can be in the form of weight loss, marketing, or business—any content relative to the brand message.  Relative content is not only provided by the brand, but also in the form of consumer-generated media.  By creating a network, consumers interact and create content for online sites.

 Next, a brand provides participation with consumers online and off. This is accomplished through the combination of typical social networking features online (personalized page, friends, groups, messaging), to interconnect fans, and elements of involvement offline.  This is not simply connecting an online platform with mobile devices, but providing separate mobile features jointly with a secondary media type to drive online usage and build relationships with the brand on the go.  By participating in mobile campaigns, users are interacting with the brand outside of traditional brick and mortar or e-commerce destinations.

 The final element of brand networking involves incentivizing participation with the other two elements. The addition of a currency or point system acts as an anchor to the brand and network in addition to creating a competitive nature between consumers.  These points are distributed for activity carried out outside of the networking site.  By incentivizing usage offline, the brand image is re-enforced for the consumer and strengthens the relationship. Consumers are turned into promoters for both the brand and the users benefit.

Fan Equity
Fan equity is the idea that by locking in consumers to a brand, they are turned into fans of the brand.  As fans, they are promoting, interacting, and consuming on a daily basis and therefore, become assets. Apple Inc. is one example of a company possessing fan equity.  Customers of Apple are extremely brand loyal and are assets to them.

Creating a fan-generated brand is a difficult but effective method of business. Through the use of brand networking, a company is able to build a consumer/fan base which provides a strong relationship between business and consumers. The trust is formed and then fans do a lot of work for the brand by word of mouth. Peer-to-peer channels are the strongest means of communication for a brand, but also one in which they can only influence and not control.

This method of business is argued to be a relationship handled by the brand generally for their own gain (Bourne, Szmigin, 1998). Many fans do not realize the work they are doing for companies by using their product or service. Facebook is a major fan-based brand which has become a global phenomenon through customer use with social media features such as sharing and commenting.

With social media's growth in popularity, marketing and advertising through social media continues to grow. Brands can display and promote their products or services efficiently at a very fast rate where consumers share and contribute to the brand on a global scale. This can also be seen as online word of mouth exposure that can produce good or bad feedback for brands.

Once consumers become fans they are typically very loyal, which can create positive word of mouth for a brand. Fans become a valuable asset boosting the status and reputation of a brand. Different perceptions of brands can be linked to a person's origin or religion which creates a difficulty when trying to enter a market or gain market share. Businesses need to be aware of the types of products or services they introduce to a specific market, by insuring they are culturally sensitive.

Fan pages are created on social media to keep the ongoing relationship between brands and consumers. By engaging and interacting with consumers, brands are able to obtain fans and produce positive imaging. Social media can also bring bad publicity to a company which can result in a loss in fan equity. Some fans become attached to brands and are often encouraged to remain as fans through the use of celebrities endorsing the brand. The addiction can become very intense and begin to control people's lives, causing them to make poor decisions and becoming obsessive consumers.

References

Social media
Brand management